Rodrigo Ignacio Valenzuela Avilés (born 27 November 1975) is a Chilean football coach and former player. He is the current assistant manager of Universidad Católica.

Club career
He is a midfielder who played for Universidad Católica. He has spent his entire career in club teams in either Chile or Mexico. He has played for Atlas, Club América and CD Veracruz in the Primera División de Mexico.

International career
He played for the international team since his debut against England on February 11, 1998. Prior to this, he played for Chile B against England B on February 10, 1998. Chile won by 2-1. He was part of the Chilean squad which participated in the 2004 Copa América.

Managerial statistics

Honours

Club
Santiago Wanderers
 Primera División (1): 2001
América
 Torneo Clausura (1): 2005
Universidad Católica
 Primera División (1): 2010
 Copa Chile (1): 2011

References

External links
 
 Rodrigo Valenzuela at playmakerstats.com (English version of ceroacero.es)
 

1975 births
Living people
Footballers from Santiago
Chilean footballers
Chilean expatriate footballers
Chile international footballers
Chile under-20 international footballers
Chilean Primera División players
Liga MX players
Liga Premier de México players
Peruvian Primera División players
Unión Española footballers
Club América footballers
Lobos BUAP footballers
Club Universitario de Deportes footballers
Santiago Wanderers footballers
Club León footballers
Atlas F.C. footballers
C.D. Veracruz footballers
Universidad de Chile footballers
Club Deportivo Universidad Católica footballers
Expatriate footballers in Mexico
Chilean expatriate sportspeople in Mexico
Expatriate footballers in Peru
Chilean expatriate sportspeople in Peru
2001 Copa América players
2004 Copa América players
Association football midfielders
People from Santiago
Chilean football managers
Chilean Primera División managers
Club Deportivo Universidad Católica managers